The lex Irnitana consists of fragments of Roman municipal laws dated to AD 91 which had been inscribed on a collection of six bronze tablets found in 1981 near El Saucejo, Spain. Together with the Lex Salpensana and the Lex Malacitana it provides the most complete version of the lex Flavia municipalis, or the Flavian municipal law. and has allowed new insights into the workings of Roman law. The tablets are exhibited in the Archeological Museum of Seville. Since the tablets provide the only surviving copy of large parts of the Flavian municipal law, they have provided new insights into the procedural side of municipal courts.

Description
The tablets measure  and each has three holes at the top and bottom to fix them to the facade of an official building at a height where it could easily be read, as expressly required by article 95. In total they must have stretched some  like an unrolled volumen. The letters measure  in height and the text is framed by a simple molding.

The six surviving tablets are engraved III, V, VII, VIII, IX and X. Fragments of tablet II have later been discovered. A sanctio, a legal endorsement, on tablet X shows that it is the last tablet. The plates each consist of three columns of text which survives largely intact. It contains 96 articles (rubricae), an addendum and a letter from Domitian. The articles are not numbered but marked by Rubrica followed by a short description. Correlating the Lex Irnitana with other finds, it is possible to reconstruct most of the original numbering except for twelve sections at the end of tablet V.

Dating
The letter which is included at the end provides two dates for the text: Litterae datae IIII idus Apriles Circeis recitatae V idus Domitianas, which dates the letter to the 10th of April and its (public) reading to the 11th of the month Domitian (October) both in the year that Manius Acilius Glabrio and Marcus Ulpius Traianus were consuls (AD 91) and is consistent with the granting of Latin Rights to Baetica in 73/74 and the original text of the document must have been composed somewhere in between using fragments of existing provisions in older laws from Augustean and even Republican times. The addendum is written in a smaller script than the rest of the text and is thought to have been added in the second or third century.

Content 
The text deals with the competencies of duumviri, aediles and quaestores, regulates the decurional order, manumission and the appointment of guardians, the relations between patronus and cliens, the acquisition of Roman civil rights by magistrates and public affairs, including the funding of cults, priesthoods, rituals, calendar and games, which were considered a religious matter.

References 

Latin inscriptions
Roman law
Archaeological discoveries in Spain
1981 archaeological discoveries
1st-century inscriptions